Sushnevo-1 is a rural locality (a settlement) in Pekshinskoye Rural Settlement, Petushinsky District, Vladimir Oblast, Russia. The population was 220 as of 2010. There are 6 streets.

Geography 
Sushnevo-1 is located on the Peksha River, 27 km east of Petushki (the district's administrative centre) by road. Zheltukhino is the nearest rural locality.

References 

Rural localities in Petushinsky District